Parasitology is a peer-reviewed scientific journal covering the area of parasitology, including the biochemistry, molecular biology, genetics, ecology and epidemiology of eukaryotic parasites, and the relationship between the host and the parasite. It was established in 1908 and is published fourteen times a year by Cambridge University Press. The editor-in-chief is John Russell Stothard (Liverpool School of Tropical Medicine; from 2015).

According to the Journal Citation Reports, the journal has a 2017 impact factor of 2.511, ranking it 15th out of 37 journals in the category "Parasitology".

Cambridge University Press announced that as of 3 October 2022, publishing would be switching to gold open access.

Abstracting and indexing
The journal is abstracted and indexed by:

References

External links

Cambridge University Press academic journals
Publications established in 1908
Parasitology journals
English-language journals
Hybrid open access journals
Journals published between 13 and 25 times per year